This is the singles draw for the second Bendigo Women's International of 2013.

Casey Dellacqua won the tournament, defeating Tammi Patterson in the final, 6–3, 6–1. Dellacqua also won the first edition of the Bendigo Women's International one week previously.

Seeds

Main draw

Finals

Top half

Bottom half

References 
 Main draw

Bendigo Women's International 2 - Singles